Winds Will Change is the second EP by William Beckett. It was released on July 17, 2012 under YIKE Records. Beckett later recorded acoustic versions of every song on this EP for The Pioneer Sessions.

Track listing 

2012 EPs
William Beckett (singer) albums